František Pavúk (born 21 July 1993) is a Slovak football defender who plays for FC Košice.

MFK Košice
He made his debut for MFK Košice against Spartak Myjava on 22 September 2012.

External links
MFK Košice profile

References

1993 births
Living people
Sportspeople from Košice
Slovak footballers
Association football defenders
FC VSS Košice players
FC Lokomotíva Košice players
FC Košice (2018) players
MFK Tatran Liptovský Mikuláš players
Slovak Super Liga players
2. Liga (Slovakia) players
3. Liga (Slovakia) players